Monographiae Biologicae is a scholarly scientific literature review series, consisting of monographs published by Kluwer Academic Publishers, an imprint of Springer Science+Business Media. The series subject area generally covers ecology, zoology, and biology. More specifically, the book series covers the biogeography of continental areas, including whole continents;  differentiated stand-alone  ecosystems such as islands, island groups, mountains or mountain chains;  aquatic or marine ecosystems such as coastal systems, mangroves, coral reefs, and other related ecosystems. Fresh water environments are also included in this series such as major river basins, lakes, and groups of lakes.

Taxonomic studies include the main groups of animals, plants, fungi and the comparative ecology of major biomes.

The series continues Physiologia comparata et oecologia,.

Abstracting and indexing
This series is indexed by the following services:

 Bibliography of agriculture (USDA)  
 Biological Abstracts 
 Chemical Abstracts Service 
 GeoRef

References

External links

Publications established in 1957
Monographic series
Springer Science+Business Media books
Biology books
Zoology books
Ecology books